The Taifa of Alpuente was a medieval taifa kingdom, of Berber origin, that existed from around 1009 to 1106 created following the end of the Caliphate of Córdoba in the Iberian Peninsula in 1010. It was centered at the city of Alpuente. It was ruled by a Berber family of the Banu Qasim tribe.

List of Emirs

Qasimid dynasty

'Abd Allah I: c. 1009–1030
Muhammad I Yumn ad-Dawla: 1030–1042
Ahmad b Muhammad 'Izz (o Adud) al-Dawla: 1042–1043
Muhammad II: 1043
'Abd Allah II: 1043–c. 1106

See also
 List of Sunni Muslim dynasties

Sources

Berber dynasties
1106 disestablishments in Europe
States and territories established in 1009
Province of Valencia
Alpuente
1009 establishments in Europe
11th-century establishments in Al-Andalus
12th-century disestablishments in Al-Andalus